The Taipei Metro Xianse Temple station is a station on the Xinzhuang Line located in Sanchong District, New Taipei, Taiwan. The station opened for service on 5 January 2012.

Station overview

This two-level, underground station has an island platform. It is located beneath the intersection of Zhongxin Rd., Sec. 5 and Guangfu Rd., Sec. 1. It was scheduled to open in March 2012 along with most of the Xinzhuang Line, but opened for service earlier on 5 January 2012.

Construction
It has three entrances, one accessibility elevator, and two vent shafts. One of the entrances is integrated with a joint development building.

Design
The theme for the station is "Steel Industry on the Sandbank" and includes features such as a perforated steel frame station entrance. The roof is separated into two parts and a glass curtain wall which helps with lighting at night.

Station layout

Exits
Exit 1: No. 155, Chongxin Rd. Sec. 5, near Guangfu Rd. Sec. 1 
Exit 2: Chongxin Rd. Sec. 5, near Zhongxing S. St.
Exit 3: Chongxin Rd. Sec. 5, near Guangfu Rd. Sec. 1

Around the station
Xianse Temple
Tangcheng Industrial Park
Carrefour, Chongxin Store
Xinggu Elementary School
Jinling Girls School
Qingchuan Home Store

References

Zhonghe–Xinlu line stations
Railway stations opened in 2012